Northampton was launched in 1740 as an East Indiaman and made one voyage in 1741 for the British East India Company (EIC). She was on a second voyage in 1744 when she foundered. For both voyages she was under the command of Captain Duncomb Backwell.

Voyage 1 (1741-42)
Northampton left the Downs on 12 March 1741, bound for China. She arrived at Whampoa on 12 August. On the return leg of her voyage she traversed the Bocca Tigris on 31 December, reached the Cape on 13 April 1742, and St Helena on 25 May. They arrived safe off of Dover on 16 September. Northampton arrived at Woolwich on 3 October.

Voyage 2 and loss
Northampton left the Nore on 20 July 1744, bound for Bombay and China. She was in company with Hardwick, but they parted during a violent storm about 50 leagues east of Bourbon. Northampton was not heard of again.

Notes, citations, and references
Notes

Citations

References
Cotton, Sir Evan (1949) East Indiamen: The East India Company's Maritime Service. (Batchworth Press).
Hackman, Rowan (2001) Ships of the East India Company. (Gravesend, Kent: World Ship Society). 

Ships of the British East India Company
1740 ships
Maritime incidents in 1744
Age of Sail merchant ships
Merchant ships of the United Kingdom